Bixa  is a genus of plants in the family Bixaceae. It is native to Mexico, Central America, Caribbean, and South America, and naturalized in other places.

Species
The genus includes the following species:
Bixa arborea Huber - Brazil, Ecuador, Peru
Bixa excelsa Gleason & Krukoff - Peru, northwestern Brazil
Bixa orellana L. - widespread from Mexico to Argentina; naturalized in West Indies, parts of Africa, India, Sri Lanka, the Philippines, Christmas Island, Hawaii, Society Islands
Bixa platycarpa Ruiz & Pav. ex G.Don - Ecuador, Peru, northwestern Brazil
Bixa urucurana Willd. -  Honduras, Panama, Colombia, Venezuela, the Guianas, Ecuador, Peru, northwestern Brazil

References

Bixaceae
Malvales genera
Taxa named by Carl Linnaeus